The 2017 Western Australian state election was held on Saturday 11 March 2017 to elect members to the Parliament of Western Australia, including all 59 seats in the Legislative Assembly and all 36 seats in the Legislative Council. The eight-and-a-half-year two-term incumbent Liberal–WA National government, led by Premier Colin Barnett, was defeated in a landslide by the Labor opposition, led by Opposition Leader Mark McGowan.

Labor won 41 of the 59 seats in the Legislative Assembly—a 12-seat supermajority. This was WA Labor's strongest performance in a state election at the time, and formed the largest majority government and seat tally in Western Australian parliamentary history until that point. Additionally, Labor exceeded all published opinion polling, winning 55.5 percent of the two-party-preferred vote from a state record landslide 12.8-point two-party swing. It was the worst defeat of a sitting government in Western Australia, as well as one of the worst defeats of a sitting state or territory government since Federation.

Labor also became the largest party in the Legislative Council with 14 of the 36 seats. The Labor government thus required at least five additional votes from non-government members to pass legislation.

Results

Legislative Assembly

The four main media networks covering the election, the ABC, Sky News, Seven News and Nine News, all called the election for Labor within two hours after polls closed. McGowan succeeded Barnett to become the 30th Premier of Western Australia.

By the morning of 12 March, two thirds of votes had been counted and seven lower house seats were still in doubt, showing that Labor had won at least 36 seats, well above the 30 required for a majority, which the ABC predicted would increase to 41. Meanwhile, the Liberals and WA Nationals had won only 10 and five seats respectively, with a further three expected to be retained by the Liberals.

The swing against the government affected traditionally safe seats. Consequently, six government ministers lost their seats in the Legislative Assembly while one lost his seat in the Legislative Council.

The Labor landslide was built primarily on a near-sweep of Perth. Labor took 34 of the capital's 43 seats on a swing of 13.6 points, accounting for nearly all of its majority. By comparison, it had gone into the election holding 17 seats in Perth. According to the ABC's Antony Green, the 10 percent swing Labor needed to make McGowan premier was not nearly as daunting as it seemed on paper. Green noted that several Liberals in outer suburban seats sat on inflated margins. Additionally, Green argued that the one vote one value reforms of 2008, which allowed Perth to elect over 70 percent of the legislature, proved to be a boost for Labor in 2017. Green noted that when Labor last governed from 2001 to 2008, it did so in a legislature where voters in country seats had twice the voting power of voters in a Perth-based seat.

Seats changing parties

1 Matt Taylor was the member for the seat of Bateman, but contested Bicton after losing preselection to Dean Nalder, the member for the abolished seat of Alfred Cove.
2 Albert Jacob was the member for the abolished seat of Ocean Reef, but instead contested Burns Beach, a seat containing much of the same territory.

 Members listed in italics did not contest their seat at this election.
 Labor also retained two seats—Collie-Preston and West Swan—which were notionally Liberal-held after the redistribution. The Liberals retained Hillarys, which was being contested by the incumbent MLA Rob Johnson as an independent.

Legislative Council

Labor became the largest party in the Legislative Council with 14 of the 36 seats. The Labor government will require at least five additional votes from non-government members to pass legislation.

On 4 April, the Western Australian Electoral Commission conducted a recount of 2013 election results to fill two casual vacancies for the remainder of the 2013–17 term caused by the resignation and subsequent election to the Legislative Assembly of Amber-Jade Sanderson (Labor) in East Metropolitan and Peter Katsambanis (Liberal) in North Metropolitan. The vacancies were filled by Bill Leadbetter (Labor) and Elise Irwin (Liberal), who will first sit in the Legislative Council on 11 May 2017.

Date of election

On 3 November 2011, the Government of Western Australia introduced fixed four-year terms for the Legislative Assembly, with the elections to be held on the second Saturday in March. The first election under the new law was the 2013 election. Previously, under electoral reforms of the Burke Government in 1987, four-year maximum terms were adopted for the Legislative Assembly, and fixed four-year terms for the Legislative Council.

Campaign
The Western Australia National Party led by Brendon Grylls, who retook the leadership in August 2016, ran on a policy to tax BHP Billiton and Rio Tinto $5 for every tonne of iron ore mined (as opposed to $0.25 currently). The big mining companies ran an advertising campaign against the policy, while a poll conducted found that 39.4% of voters surveyed supported the policy, 37.1% opposed and 23.5% were undecided.

The Liberal Party undertook a preference deal with One Nation during the elections, saying the party held less extreme views than it did in the 1990s. Some One Nation candidates were against the preference deal with the Liberal Party.

Seats held

Lower house
At the 2013 election, Labor won 21 seats, the Liberals won 31 seats and the Nationals won 7 seats. No seats were won by independents.

On 15 April 2016, the Liberal member for Hillarys, Rob Johnson, resigned from the Liberals to sit as an independent, leaving the government with 30 seats in the lower house.

Upper house
At the 2013 election, the Liberals won 17 seats, Labor won 11 seats, the Nationals won five seats, the Greens won two seats and the Shooters and Fishers won one seat.

Western Australia's Legislative Council is divided into six regions. Three are based in Perth, while three are rural. Each region elects six members to the Legislative Council. These areas are not of similar population sizes, with rural areas receiving from one and a half to about six times the effective membership of the metropolitan regions.

The Western Australian rural population dropped from about 12.1% to 10.7% of the state's enrolled electors after the 2008 election. Election analyst Antony Green predicted this would make it more difficult for the Liberals or Labor (who typically perform better in Perth than rural areas) to increase their presence within the Legislative Council.

Redistribution

A redistribution of electoral boundaries for the lower house was completed on 27 November 2015. This resulted in a net gain of one seat for the Liberals from Labor. The Liberal seats of Alfred Cove, Eyre and Ocean Reef, the Labor seat of Gosnells and the National seat of Wagin were abolished. Five new seats were created (or re-created): the notionally Liberal seats of Bicton (mostly replacing Alfred Cove) and Burns Beach (mostly replacing Ocean Reef), the notionally Labor seats of Baldivis (created from parts of Kwinana and Warnbro) and Thornlie (replacing Gosnells), and the notionally National seat of Roe (merging Wagin and Eyre). The Labor seats of Collie-Preston and West Swan became notionally Liberal.

Retiring MPs
Members who did not re-nominate at the 2017 election:

Liberal
John Castrilli MLA (Bunbury) – announced 14 March 2016
Kim Hames MLA (Dawesville) – announced 2 August 2014
Liz Behjat MLC (North Metropolitan) – lost preselection
Barry House MLC (South West) – announced 27 October 2015

National
Wendy Duncan MLA (Kalgoorlie) – announced 4 December 2015
Terry Waldron MLA (Wagin) – announced 25 November 2014

Electoral pendulums
The following Mackerras pendulums work by lining up all of the seats according to the percentage point margin post-election on a two-candidate-preferred basis, grouped as marginal, safe etc. as defined by the Australian Electoral Commission.

Pre-election pendulum

This pendulum takes the redistribution into account. One sitting member, retiring Wagin Nationals MP Terry Waldron, does not appear in this pendulum: his seat was combined with Eyre to form Roe, a seat with a National margin that will also be contested by Eyre Liberal MP Graham Jacobs, who is listed as the defending member below. Two Liberal members, Dean Nalder (Alfred Cove, now renamed Bicton) and Matt Taylor (Bateman), were contesting each other's seats; this is reflected below. Retiring members are listed in italics.

Post-election pendulum

Opinion polling

Graphical summary

Voting intention

Newspaper endorsements

See also
Candidates of the 2017 Western Australian state election
Members of the Western Australian Legislative Assembly, 2017–2021
Members of the Western Australian Legislative Council, 2017–2021

References

External links
 Early voting centres at Western Australian Electoral Commission
 Voting Systems in WA at Western Australian Electoral Commission

2017 elections in Australia
2017 in Western Australia
Elections in Western Australia
March 2017 events in Australia